George Grey Barnard (May 24, 1863 – April 24, 1938), often written George Gray Barnard, was an American sculptor who trained in Paris. He is especially noted for his heroic sized Struggle of the Two Natures in Man at the Metropolitan Museum of Art, his twin sculpture groups at the Pennsylvania State Capitol, and his Lincoln statue in Cincinnati, Ohio. His major works are largely symbolical in character. His personal collection of medieval architectural fragments became  a core part of The Cloisters in New York City.

Biography
Barnard was born in Bellefonte, Pennsylvania, but grew up in Kankakee, Illinois, the son of the Reverend Joseph Barnard and Martha Grubb; the grandson and namesake of merchant George Grey Grubb; and a great-grandson of Curtis Grubb, a fourth-generation member of the Grubb iron family and a onetime owner of the celebrated Gray's Ferry Tavern outside Philadelphia. 

Barnard first studied at the Art Institute of Chicago under Leonard Volk. The prize he was awarded for a marble bust of a Young Girl enabled him to go to Paris, where, over a period of three and half years, he attended the École nationale supérieure des Beaux-Arts in Paris (1883–1887), while also working in the atelier of Pierre-Jules Cavelier. He lived in Paris for twelve years, and scored a great success with his first exhibit at the Salon of 1894. He returned to America in 1896, and married Edna Monroe of Boston. He taught at the Art Students League of New York from 1900 to 1903, succeeding Augustus Saint-Gaudens. He returned to France, and spent the next eight years working on his sculpture groups for the Pennsylvania State Capitol. He was elected an associate member of the National Academy of Design in 189x, and an academician in 1902.

A strong Rodin influence is evident in his early work. His principal works include the allegorical Struggle of the Two Natures in Man" (1894, in the Metropolitan Museum, New York); The Hewer (1902, at Cairo, Illinois); The Great God Pan (1899, at Columbia University); the Rose Maiden (1902, at Muscatine, Iowa); the simple and graceful Maidenhood (1896, at Brookgreen Gardens).

The Great God Pan (1899), one of the first works Barnard completed after his return to America, was originally intended for the Dakota Apartments on Central Park West. Alfred Corning Clark, builder of the Dakota, had financed Barnard's early career; when Clark died in 1896, the Clark family presented Barnard's Two Natures to the Metropolitan Museum of Art in his memory, and the giant bronze Pan was presented to Columbia University, by Clark's son, Edward Severin Clark.

In 1911 he completed two large sculpture groups for the new Pennsylvania State Capitol: The Burden of Life: The Broken Law and Love and Labor: The Unbroken Law. Between the two groups, they feature 27 larger-than-life figures.

His larger-than-life statue of Abraham Lincoln (1917) drew heated controversy because of its rough-hewn features and slouching stance. The first casting is at Lytle Park in Cincinnati, Ohio; the second in Manchester, England (1919); and the third in Louisville, Kentucky (1922).

French art dealer René Gimpel described him in his diary (1923), as "an excellent American sculptor" who is "very much engrossed in carving himself a fortune out of the trade in works of art." Barnard had a commanding personal manner: "He talks of art as if it were a cabalistic science of which he is the only astrologer", wrote the unsympathetic Gimpel; "he speaks to impress. He's a sort of Rasputin of criticism. The Rockefellers are his imperial family. And the dealers court him."

Interested in medieval art, Barnard gathered discarded fragments of medieval architecture from French villages before World War I.  He established this collection in a church-like brick building near his home in Washington Heights, Manhattan in New York City. The collection was purchased by John D. Rockefeller Jr. in 1925 and forms part of the nucleus of The Cloisters collection, part of the Metropolitan Museum of Art. At least one object, sold to the Museum of Fine Arts, Boston in 1924, he offered with misleading provenance.

Barnard died following a heart attack on April 24, 1938, at the Harkness Pavilion, Columbia University Medical Center in New York.  He was working on a statue of Abel, betrayed by his brother Cain, when he fell ill. He is interred at Harrisburg Cemetery in Harrisburg, Pennsylvania.

1913 Assessment by Lorado Taft

Selected works

 
 The Boy (marble, 1885), private collection
 Cain (1886, destroyed)
 Brotherly Love (Two Friends) (marble, 1886–87), Langesund, Norway.
Brotherly Love (bronze, 1886–87), Clark Art Institute, Williamstown, Massachusetts.
Brotherly Love (marble, 1894), Edward Severin Clark monument, Lakewood Cemetery, Cooperstown, New York.
 Struggle of the Two Natures in Man (marble, 1892–1894), Metropolitan Museum of Art.
 Maidenhood (Innocence) (1896), Brookgreen Gardens, Murrell's Inlet, South Carolina. Evelyn Nesbitt posed as the model.
 Maiden with the Roses (Rose Maiden) (marble, 1898), Greenwood Cemetery, Muscatine, Iowa
 Urn of Life (1898–1900), Carnegie Museum of Art, Pittsburgh, Pennsylvania. Created to hold the ashes of Metropolitan Opera conductor Anton Seidl.
 The Mystery of Life (marble, 1895–1897), Smithsonian American Art Museum, Washington, D.C. Exhibited at the 1913 Armory Show.
 The Birth (marble, 1895–1897). Exhibited at the 1913 Armory Show.
 Solitude (Adam and Eve) (marble, 1906). Exhibited at the 1913 Armory Show. Marble versions are at the Taft Museum of Art in Cincinnati, Ohio; the Chrysler Museum of Art in Norfolk, Virginia; and the Loeb Art Center in Poughkeepsie, New York.
 The Great God Pan (1899), Dodge Hall Quadrangle, Columbia University, New York City. Exhibited at 1900 Paris Exposition, and the 1901 Pan-American Exposition in Buffalo, New York.
 Transportation – Henry Bradley Plant Fountain (1900), University of Tampa, Tampa, Florida
 The Hewer (1902), Halliday Park, Cairo, Illinois, dedicated 1906. Exhibited at the 1904 St. Louis World's Fair.
 A plaster version is at Schwab Auditorium, Pennsylvania State University, University Park.
 A marble version is at Kykuit, Pocantico Hills, New York.
 Architectural sculpture (1902–03), New Amsterdam Theatre, 214 West 42nd Street, Manhattan, New York City. Barnard's façade and roof garden sculptures were removed in 1937, and are unlocated.
 The Prodigal Son (1904). One of the sculptures for Love and Labor: The Unbroken Law, at the Pennsylvania State Capitol.
The Prodigal Son (marble, 1904–1906), Carnegie Museum of Art, Pittsburgh, Pennsylvania. Exhibited at the 1913 Armory Show. 
The Prodigal Son (marble, 1904), Speed Art Museum, Louisville, Kentucky.
 2 pedimental sculpture groups: History; The Arts (1913–1917), Main Branch, New York Public Library, Manhattan
 Rising Woman (marble, 1916), Kykuit, Pocantico Hills, New York.
 A plaster version is at Schwab Auditorium, Pennsylvania State University, University Park.
 Statue of Abraham Lincoln (bronze, 1917), Lytle Park, Cincinnati, Ohio.
Abraham Lincoln (bronze, 1919 casting), Lincoln Square, Manchester, England
Abraham Lincoln (bronze, 1922 casting), Louisville, Kentucky.
 Head of Abraham Lincoln (marble, 1919), Metropolitan Museum of Art.
Let There Be Light (bronze, 1922), Isaac Wolfe Bernheim monument, Bernheim Arboretum and Research Forest, Clermont, Kentucky. 
 A 1928 marble replica marks the grave of Barnard's parents at Springvale Cemetery, Madison, Indiana.
 A 1936 marble replica is at the entrance to Scripps Park, Rushville, Illinois.
 Adam and Eve Fountain (1923) Kykuit, Pocantico Hills, New York.
 The Refugee (Grief) (marble, by 1930), Metropolitan Museum of Art.

Gallery

Pennsylvania State Capitol sculpture groups

North group: Love and Labor: The Unbroken Law (marble, 1911), Pennsylvania State Capitol, Harrisburg.

South group: The Burden of Life: The Broken Law (marble, 1911), Pennsylvania State Capitol, Harrisburg.

Legacy
Among Barnard's students were Anna Hyatt Huntington, Abastenia St. Leger Eberle, Beatrice Ashley Chanler and Malvina Hoffman.
 Barnard donated 100 of his plaster models to the Kankakee County Museum in Kankakee, Illinois.
 A collection of his Medieval architectural elements is at the Philadelphia Museum of Art.
 The George Grey Barnard Sculpture Garden was created in Bellefonte, Pennsylvania (his birthplace) in 1978.

Notes

References

Further reading
 
 Harold E. Dickson, ed. George Grey Barnard: Centenary Exhibition, 1863–1963 (exh. cat.  Pennsylvania State University, 1964).
Sara Dodge Kimbrough, Drawn from Life: The Story of Four American Artists Whose Friendship & Work Began in Paris During the 1880s, Jackson: University Press of Mississippi, 1976.
Susan Martis, "Famous and Forgotten: Rodin and Three Contemporaries," Ph.D. dissertation, Case Western Reserve University, 2004.
Frederick C. Moffatt, Errant Bronzes: George Grey Barnard's Statues of Abraham Lincoln, Newark: University of Delaware Press, 1998.
"The George Grey Banard Collection," Philadelphia Museum Bulletin 40, no. 206 (1945): [49]–[64].
Robinson Galleries, The George Grey Barnard Collection, New York: The Galleries, 1941.
 Nicholas Fox Weber, The Clarks of Cooperstown: Their Singer Sewing Machine Fortune, Their Great and Influential Art Collections, Their Forty-Year Feud, New York: Alfred A. Knopf, 2007.

External links

 George Grey Barnard Exhibit – Kankakee County Historical Society (scroll down)
 George Grey Barnard Papers – Philadelphia Museum of Art
 Centre County Historical Society
 
The George Grey Barnard Papers: 1889-1967 from the Cloisters Library and Archives, The Metropolitan Museum of Art, New York.

Archives of American Art
Photograph of Barnard's sculpture of Lincoln
A finding aid to the George Grey Barnard selected papers, circa 1860–1969, bulk 1880–1938 in the Archives of American Art, Smithsonian Institution
George Grey Barnard selected papers, 1895–1941
George Grey Barnard letters to Mr. Van der Weyde

1863 births
1938 deaths
American architectural sculptors
People from Bellefonte, Pennsylvania
Burials at Harrisburg Cemetery
People from Kankakee, Illinois
People from Washington Heights, Manhattan
School of the Art Institute of Chicago alumni
American alumni of the École des Beaux-Arts
Artists from New York City
Sculptors from Pennsylvania
Sculptors from Illinois
20th-century American sculptors
20th-century American male artists
19th-century American sculptors
19th-century American male artists
American male sculptors
People associated with the Philadelphia Museum of Art
Sculptors from New York (state)